Mallow is a town in County Cork, Ireland, approximately thirty-five kilometres north of Cork. Mallow is in the barony of Fermoy.

It is the administrative centre of north County Cork, and the Northern Divisional Offices of Cork County Council are located in the town. Mallow is part of the Cork East Dáil constituency.

Name
The earliest form of the name is Magh nAla, meaning "plain of the stone". In the anglicisation "Mallow", -ow originally represented a reduced schwa sound, which is now however pronounced as a full vowel . In 1975, Mala—a shortening of Magh nAla—was among the first Irish placenames adopted by statute, on the advice of the Placenames branch of the Ordnance Survey of Ireland.

In the Annals of the Four Masters, compiled in the 1630s, Magh nAla is misrepresented as Magh Eala, the Donegal-based authors being insufficiently familiar with Cork places. P.W. Joyce in 1869 surmised that in Magh Eala , Ealla referred to the river Blackwater, and connected the name to the nearby barony of Duhallow. Professor T. F. O'Rahilly in 1938 interpreted Magh Eala as "plain of the swans". This false etymology remains widely cited and has caused resentment by some of the official Mala as being a gratuitous simplification of Magh Eala. However, the name Mala has been used in Irish for more than 300 years.

History
Evidence of pre-historic settlement is found in Beenalaght (13.6 km/8.5 miles south-west of Mallow), where an alignment of six standing stones lie on a hill to the west of the Mallow-Coachford Road. (grid ref: 485 873, Latitude: 52.035818N Longitude: 8.751181W).

During the Irish War of Independence, the town served as the headquarters of the North Cork Militia (also known as North Cork Rifles), a unit in the Irish Republican Army (IRA). On 27 September, IRA commanders Ernie O'Malley and Liam Lynch led the Cork No. 2 Brigade in an attack against the military barracks in Mallow, which was garrisoned by elements of the 17th Lancers. The successful attack saw the IRA capture large quantities of firearms and ammunition, partially burning the barracks in the process. In reprisal, angered soldiers from Buttevant and Fermoy went on a rampage in Mallow, burning several main street premises, including the town hall and creamery, on the next day.

On February 1921, the IRA killed the wife of RIC Captain W. H. King during a botched assassination attempt on her husband near the Mallow railway station. In retaliation, a detachment of the Black and Tans briefly occupied the station, arresting and killing three of its occupants- Patrick Devitt, Daniel Mullane and Denis Bennett, all of whom were railway workers. The killings prompted an industrial action by the National Railworkers Union in Britain and Ireland.

Geography
Mallow lies on the River Blackwater, and developed as a defensive settlement protecting an important fort on the river.

Some of the highest naturally occurring readings of radon ever have been recorded in Mallow, prompting local fears regarding lung cancer.

Demography

As of the 2016 census, the town had a population of 12,459. In the same census the population was reportedly made up of 76% white Irish, 1% white Irish travellers, 12% other white ethnicities, 4% black, 2% Asian, 2% other, with 3% not stating their ethnicity.

Economy
Mallow developed in the late 16th century as a plantation town. It prospered throughout the centuries as a market town due to its rich agricultural hinterland. Irish statesmen such as Thomas Davis and William O'Brien were both born in Mallow in the 19th century. The main street in Mallow is called Davis Street (although commonly referred to as Main Street), and joins with William O'Brien Street outside Mallow Town Hall. At the point where Davis Street meets O'Brien Street there is a monument to J.J. Fitzgerald, a little-known local politician who was involved in establishing both Mallow Urban District Council and Cork County Council.

The town developed an industrial base in the early 20th century, based largely on its agricultural capability, with dairy produce and sugar beet supplying the Sugar Factory, Rowntree Mackintosh, Bournes and Dairygold. Changes in the European Union sugar subsidy programme resulted in the closure of the sugar beet factory in mid-2006, after 75 years of continual production. One of the last sugar beet plants to be closed in Ireland.

Transport and communications

Road
Mallow lies at the convergence of several important routes: National Primary Route 20 (N20) north-south road between Cork (35 km) and Limerick (70 km), National Secondary Route 72 (N72) east-west between Dungarvan (51.5 km) and Killarney (41.5 km), National Secondary Route 73 (N73) northeast to Mitchelstown and the M8 motorway (21 km).

Bus
Mallow is a stop on the Bus Éireann 51 bus service from Cork to Galway and 243 bus service from Cork to Newmarket service. Mallow is also serviced by the TFI Local Link buses, connecting the town with Fermoy, Mitchelstown and Charleville via three separate routes, with stops in intermediary villages.

Rail
The Mallow railway viaduct which straddles the Blackwater, commonly known as the "Ten Arch Bridge", was bombed and destroyed during the Irish Civil War. It was rapidly rebuilt in girder form due to its importance in connecting the Cork, Tralee and Dublin lines. An additional line east through Fermoy and Lismore to the Waterford South station closed in 1967. Mallow railway station was opened on 17 March 1849 by the Great Southern and Western Railway. It is served by trains to via Limerick Junction to Dublin Heuston, Cork and Killarney, Farranfore and Tralee.

Onward connecting trains link Mallow via Limerick Junction to Limerick, Ennis, Athenry and Galway as well as Carrick-on-Suir and Waterford.

Air
The nearest airports are Cork Airport (42.5 km), Kerry Airport (70 km) and Shannon Airport (84 km). Kerry Airport is accessible by train from Farranfore railway station.

There is a flying club at nearby Rathcoole Aerodrome, and a helicopter charter company in nearby Dromahane.

Mallow Racecourse, now known as Cork Racecourse, became an emergency airfield on 18 April 1983, when a Mexican Gulfstream II business jet piloted by Captain Reuben Ocaña made a precautionary landing. A temporary tarmacadam runway of 910 m (3,000 ft) in length which was paid for by the plane's insurers was laid to enable the aircraft to leave five weeks later. In the meantime, Captain Ocaña became a local celebrity. On 23 May 1983 just before the plane departed, the Captain said his farewell to the people of Ireland in the Irish language. The runway was subsequently used for parking during race meets and for learner driving. Light aircraft have occasionally landed at the racecourse on the grass area. The F3A World Model Aircraft Aerobatic Championship was held there in 2001. The 1983 incident formed the basis of the 2010 film The Runway.

Sport
Founded in 1882, Mallow Rugby Club is one of the oldest rugby clubs in the country. Former players include Munster Second Row Ian Nagle, who played juvenile rugby for Mallow and Ulster Prop Jerry Cronin, who played juvenile and Junior Rugby for the club.

The town's association football club, Mallow United Football Club, was founded in 1926 and fields senior, junior, schoolboy, and schoolgirl football teams in the Munster Leagues.

The local racecourse, Cork Racecourse, now renamed "Cork Racecourse Mallow", plays host to large horse racing events.

Mallow GAA is the town's GAA club, and fields teams in hurling and Gaelic football. The club won the 2017 Cork Premier Intermediate Football Championship.

Mallow Golf Club, founded in 1947, is located just outside Mallow and has 18 holes. Mallow AC is a local running club.

Amenities
Mallow is home to a branch of the Gate Cinema as well as a county library with an exhibition space. Other community amenities include a youth centre and a public swimming pool. The town also has several gyms and pubs. A farmers' market is held in the grounds of St James' Church on Friday mornings. Mallow Castle also hosts seasonal events.

People

Sister Celeste Bowe (1931–1976), Daughters of Charity of Saint Vincent de Paul nun and nurse was born in Newberry, Mallow
Elaine Crowley (b.1977), television presenter from Newtwopothouse near Mallow
Thomas Osborne Davis (1814–1845), nationalist, politician, author, poet and author of the rebel song "A Nation Once Again", was born here.
Carl Dodd (1942–2018), Irish Army officer who served as Chief of Staff of the United Nations Truce Supervision Organization (UNTSO) from 2002 to 2004, was born in Mallow.
Donovan (b.1946), singer born in Scotland who now lives near Mallow
John Hogan (1805–1892), a United States representative from Missouri born in Mallow.
Paul Kane (1810–1871), Canadian painter
Joe Lynch (1925–2001), actor
Joan Denise Moriarty (c.1910–1992), ballet dancer, dance teacher and musician, and niece of John Francis (below), is believed to have been born in Mallow.
John Francis Moriarty (1855–1915) Attorney General for Ireland and judge of the Irish Court of Appeal.
Robert Murphy (1806–1843), mathematician and physicist.
William O'Brien (1852–1928), nationalist, journalist, agrarian agitator, social revolutionary, politician, party leader, newspaper publisher and author.
Stephen O'Flynn (b.1982), former League of Ireland and NIFL Premiership footballer
John Baptist Purcell (1800–1883), Bishop of Cincinnati from 1833 to his death.
Richard Quain (1816–1898), physician to Queen Victoria, author of Quain's Dictionary of Medicine.
Seán Sherlock (b.1972), Labour Party TD for Cork East Constituency, was born in Mallow
Sir Edward Sullivan, 1st Baronet (1822–1885), Lord Chancellor of Ireland, was born in Mallow.

International relations

Mallow is twinned with the towns of
 Tinley Park, Illinois, United States
 Landreger, Côtes-d'Armor, Brittany, France

See also
 Metropolitan Cork
 List of towns and villages in Ireland
 Mallow (Parliament of Ireland constituency)
 The Corkman
 Davis College (Mallow)

References

External links

 Official website
 Mallow town community website
 Mallow Town Online Guide
 Record of RIC casualties from the Mallow area 1916-22 accessed 11 June 2021

 
Towns and villages in County Cork